There were three special elections to the United States Senate in 1941 during the 77th United States Congress.

Race summary 
In these elections, the winners were elected in 1941 after January 3; sorted by election date.

Mississippi (special) 

Four-term Democratic senator Pat Harrison died June 22, 1941 and Democrat James Eastland was appointed June 30, 1941 to continue the term.  Democrat Wall Doxey won the September 29, 1941 special election, but would later lose renomination to Eastland for the next term in 1942.

South Carolina (special) 

James F. Byrnes (Democratic) had resigned July 8, 1941 and Alva Lumpkin (Democratic) was appointed July 22, 1941 to continue the term.  Lumpkin died, however, August 1, 1941, so Roger C. Peace (Democratic) was then appointed August 5, 1941 to continue the term.  Peace was not a candidate in the special election.

Governor Burnet R. Maybank took the most votes in the September 2, 1941 Democratic primary over Governor Olin Johnston and Representative Joseph R. Bryson. Maybank then won the September 16, 1941 primary runoff. Maybank won the general election unopposed and would serve through two general elections (1942 and 1948) until his death in 1954.

Texas (special) 

Democrat Morris Sheppard died April 9, 1941 and Democrat Andrew Jackson Houston was appointed April 21, 1941  to continue the term.  Houston died, however, June 26, 1941, before the August 4, 1941 special election. In a 14-candidate race, "Pappy" W. Lee O'Daniel (Democratic) won a slim plurality over Representative Lyndon Baines Johnson (Democratic), which was sufficient for the election.

References 

 Mississippi: United States Congressional Elections, 1788-1997 The Official Results Michael J. Dubin
 Texas: Southern Primaries and Elections, 1920-1949 (O'Daniel, Johnson, Mann, Dies) and Brownsville Herald, 6/15/1941 (rest)

 
1941